Launaea arborescens is a species of flowering plant in the family Asteraceae.

Taxonomy
The species was first described by Jules Aimé Battandier in 1888 as Zollikoferia arborescens. It was transferred to Launaea in 1923 by Svante Samuel Murbeck.

Distribution
The species occurs in Spain, the Canary Islands, Algeria, Morocco, Mauritania and Cape Verde.

References

arborescens